The yellow-bellied flowerpecker (Dicaeum melanozanthum) is a species of bird in the flowerpecker family Dicaeidae.

It is found in Bangladesh, Bhutan, China, India, Laos, Myanmar, Nepal, Thailand, and Vietnam. Its natural habitats are temperate forests and subtropical or tropical moist montane forests.

References

yellow-bellied flowerpecker
Birds of North India
Birds of Eastern Himalaya
Birds of Central China
Birds of Yunnan
Birds of Myanmar
yellow-bellied flowerpecker
yellow-bellied flowerpecker
Taxonomy articles created by Polbot